Vârșolț Reservoir is the largest lake in Sălaj County, Romania.

It is a reservoir was made in 1976-1979. Vârșolț Lake is situated in Crasna basin, between Crasna and Vârșolț. The lake was created by the floods mitigation and protection against floodings. Created after 1970 floods in Romania, the lake controls the water output of the Crasna River. Vârșolț Lake is a drinking water source for Zalău and Șimleu Silvaniei towns. The lake's surface is of 652 ha.

References

External links
 Apa mai buna si un baraj mai sigur la Varsolt
 Accumulation lake
 Varsolt lake
 Barajul Varsolt - repopulat cu o tona de puiet de crap

Lakes of Romania
Geography of Sălaj County
Reservoirs in Romania